William Church Moir (2 May 1822 – 5 July 1896) was the son of Benjamin Moir and Mary Isabella Church, declared by many as one of the most energetic and enterprising businessmen in Halifax, Nova Scotia.

Professional life
Native of Scotland, the Moir family moved to Nova Scotia to set up a bakery in the heart of the city of Halifax. At age of 23 William inherited the family business Moir & Co. Steam Bakery & Flour Mill in 1845, after the death of his father. His small bakery, by the time of his death in 1896 would employ over 260 workers, produce over 11,000 loaves of bread daily. In 1873 with his son, James Ward Moir they started Moir's Chocolate and made over 500 types of confectionery that was sold across Canada, which was unheard of at the time.

Children
Annie Moir
James Ward Moir- president and general manager in 1890
Willam C. Moir
Maud Moir
Benjamin Moir - established Ben's bakery
Henry Moir

References 

 

1822 births
1896 deaths
Businesspeople from Nova Scotia
People from Halifax, Nova Scotia